Zeyti-ye Seh (also Romanized as Zeytī-ye Seh; also known as Zeytī) is a village in Barez Rural District, Manj District, Lordegan County, Chaharmahal and Bakhtiari Province, Iran. At the 2006 census, its population was 82, in 14 families.

References 

Populated places in Lordegan County